Laurel and Hardy refers to the comedy film duo. It may also refer to;
Laurel and Hardy filmography
Laurel and Hardy (TV series)
Laurel and Hardy music
Laurel and Hardy (play)
The All New Adventures of Laurel & Hardy in For Love or Mummy
Laurel & Hardy (reggae)
The Laurel-Hardy Murder Case